Onjob is a Papuan language of New Guinea. It is a rather divergent member of the Dagan family.

It is spoken in Koreat and Naukwate villages in Tufi Rural LLG, Oro Province.

External links 
 Materials on Karnai are included in the open access Arthur Capell collection (AC1) and Tom Dutton (TD1) collection held by Paradisec.

References

Languages of Papua New Guinea
Languages of Oro Province
Dagan languages
Vulnerable languages